Breeze Center is a shopping center in Songshan District, Taipei, Taiwan.

History
The site was originally the production plants of HeySong Corporation. The shopping center began construction in 1998. The center was opened on 26 October 2001 by founder Paul Liao.

Transportation
The shopping center is accessible within walking distance North from Zhongxiao Fuxing Station of the Taipei Metro.

See also
 List of shopping malls in Taipei

References

External links
 Official website

2001 establishments in Taiwan
Shopping malls established in 2001
Shopping malls in Taipei